The 2018 Fukuoka International Women's Cup was a professional tennis tournament played on outdoor carpet courts. It was the eighteenth edition of the tournament and was part of the 2018 ITF Women's Circuit. It took place in Fukuoka, Japan, on 7–13 May 2018.

Singles main draw entrants

Seeds 

 1 Rankings as of 30 April 2018.

Other entrants 
The following players received a wildcard into the singles main draw:
  Misa Eguchi
  Yuki Naito
  Naho Sato
  Mei Yamaguchi

The following players received entry from the qualifying draw:
  Rika Fujiwara
  Mina Miyahara
  Tara Moore
  Olivia Tjandramulia

The following player received entry as a lucky loser:
  Nagi Hanatani
  Erina Hayashi
  Aiko Yoshitomi

Champions

Singles

 Katie Boulter def.  Ksenia Lykina, 5–7, 6–4, 6–2

Doubles
 
 Naomi Broady /  Asia Muhammad def.  Tara Moore /  Amra Sadiković, 6–2, 6–0

External links 
 Official website
 2018 Fukuoka International Women's Cup at ITFtennis.com

2018 ITF Women's Circuit
2018 in Japanese women's sport
Fukuoka International Women's Cup
2018 in Japanese tennis